"La novia" is a popular song by Chilean songwriter Joaquín Prieto, first recorded by his brother Antonio Prieto. Recorded in Mexico, it became an instant hit in that country and the brothers' native Chile.

After popularizing both in South America and Europe in its original form, it was recorded by British singer Julie Rogers in 1964 as "The Wedding" (sometimes credited as "The Wedding (La Novia)". The song was included on Rogers' extended play from 1964, which was also titled The Wedding, and has appeared on various compilation albums in the years since its release.

Background, original release and international success
Joaquín Prieto, a Chilean musician, wrote a song in Spanish in 1960 that he called "La novia" ("The bride"). It was inspired by an experience lived by his brother Antonio Prieto. In 1982, Antonio told Ecuadorian magazine Hogar "I was the boyfriend of a Chilean girl and I had to leave my country to make some money. When I returned, she was getting married". While Joaquín Prieto composed the song in Chile, Antonio recorded it in Mexico in 1961. It was distributed by RCA Victor, first in South America and later in Spain, Italy and other countries, where it became an instant hit.

Soon later, in 1961, an Argentinian film based on the song, titled La novia was produced, with Elsa Daniel as the main role. Antonio Prieto was part of the cast. The Prieto brothers visited Spain in 1962 and were received enthusiastically by the local press and fans. By the next year, Joaquín was living between Italy and Spain, having signed a contract with RCA Victor as a songwriter. Antonio's "La novia" reached number-one in the Spanish charts in the 3 and 10 July 1961 weeks, while the original version of Prieto and cover versions by Domenico Modugno and Tony Dallara were the number one hit in Italy between the weeks of 9 September and 16 December (except the week of 7 October).

Both the original Spanish version, recorded by Joaquín Prieto's brother, Antonio in Argentina, and an English translation by Fred Jay soon became well known in Europe and the United States, and numerous artists recorded versions of the song during the early 1960s. Among artists who recorded versions of "The Wedding" during this time were Anita Bryant and Malcolm Vaughan.  The song was also a major hit in Japan in a Japanese version by Peggy Hayama, under the original title of "La Novia." Irish singer Dickie Rock recorded a version of the song in 1988. The Daffodil Junior Australians children's choir recorded a version titled "The Wedding Song" on Troubadour Records in 1972.

Despite the enormous success of the song, songwriter Joaquín Prieto told Las Últimas Noticias in 1963 "I have to confess La novia is a song I do not like at all. [...] There is an impressive amount of [cover] versions I cannot see. While it is true the song is popular, if you increase such condition...". Chilean Radio Minería chose, in 1966, La novia as "the most popular song in the last twenty years".

Julie Rogers version

Julie Rogers heard the song while working in Spain in the early 1960s, and by 1964 she was the featured singer with British bandleader Teddy Foster. After recording a version of the song "It's Magic", and releasing the latter as her debut single, Rogers suggested "The Wedding" as its follow-up, since it was a song she remembered fondly from her time in Spain. The single was released in the UK in August 1964 and marked her first appearance on the UK Singles Chart, steadily climbing the chart until it spent two weeks at number three in October and November of that year. Around this time Rogers' recording was released in the U.S., and "The Wedding" reached number ten on the Billboard Hot 100 chart and logged three weeks atop the Billboard Middle-Road Singles (adult contemporary) chart in January 1965. The song also reached the top of the Australian Kent Music Report and was a hit in other countries as well. In the mid-1970s, it was estimated that over seven million copies of the song had been sold, and for many years after its release, it was a popular selection at wedding ceremonies around the world.

Charts
 Antonio Prieto's version

 Domenico Modugno's version

 Tony Dallara's version

 Julie Rogers' version

See also
List of number-one singles in Australia during the 1960s
List of number-one adult contemporary singles of 1965 (U.S.)

References

External links
Prieto's La novia list of releases on Discogs

1960 songs
1961 singles
1964 singles
Julie Rogers songs
Number-one singles in Australia
Pop ballads
Mercury Records singles
1950s ballads
Number-one singles in Italy
Chilean pop songs